This is a list of early pre-recorded sound and/or talking movies produced, co-produced, and/or distributed by Warner Bros. and its subsidiary First National (FN) for the years 1927–1931.

Silent film
silent film with Vitaphone track unless otherwise noted

Sound film
These films consist of part-talking, part-silent with Vitaphone soundtrack, unless otherwise noted.

Films released in 1930 and after are All-Talking

No further Silent Films with Synchronized Scores or Part-Talkies were made or released.

Notes

See also
List of early color feature films
List of lost films
List of incomplete or partially lost films
Vitaphone Varieties

Warner Bros. films
 
Early Warner Bros. talking features